Compulsion is a 1959 American crime drama film directed by Richard Fleischer. The film is based on the 1956 novel of the same name by Meyer Levin, which in turn was a fictionalized account of the Leopold and Loeb murder trial. It was the first film produced by Richard D. Zanuck.

Although the principal roles are played by Dean Stockwell and Bradford Dillman, top billing went to Orson Welles.

Plot
Close friends Judd Steiner (based on Nathan Leopold and played by Dean Stockwell) and Artie Strauss (based on Richard Loeb and played by Bradford Dillman) kill a boy, Paulie Kessler, on his way home from school in order to commit the "perfect crime". Strauss tries to cover it up, but they are caught when police find a key piece of evidence — Steiner's glasses, which he inadvertently left at the scene of the crime. Famed attorney Jonathan Wilk (based on Clarence Darrow and played by Orson Welles) takes their case, saving them from hanging by making an impassioned closing argument against capital punishment.

Cast

Production
Welles, whose recent thriller Touch of Evil was overlooked in America (though appreciated in Europe), was bitter at not being selected to direct Compulsion. His time on the set was tense, and he threw frequent tantrums.

In the early 1950s, Meyer Levin visited Nathan Leopold in prison and requested that Leopold cooperate with him on writing a novel based on the murder (the other murderer, Richard Loeb, was dead at that time). Leopold declined saying he did not wish his story told in fictionalized form but asked Levin if he could help him write his memoir. Levin was unhappy with that suggestion and wrote the novel anyway, releasing it in 1956. The novel was called Compulsion, the book the film is based on. Leopold read the book and reportedly did not like it. Leopold later wrote that reading the book made him "physically sick ... More than once I had to lay the book down and wait for the nausea to subside. I felt as I suppose a man would feel if he were exposed stark-naked under a strong spotlight before a large audience."

In 1959, Leopold sought unsuccessfully to block production of the film on the grounds that Levin's book had invaded his privacy, defamed him, profited from his life story, and "intermingled fact and fiction to such an extent that they were indistinguishable." 
Eventually the Illinois Supreme Court ruled against him, noting that Leopold, as the confessed perpetrator of the "crime of the century" could not reasonably demonstrate that Levin's book had damaged his reputation.

Reception
At the 1959 Cannes Film Festival, Dillman, Stockwell, and Welles won the Best Actor Award.
The film was nominated for the BAFTA best picture of the year, Richard Fleischer was nominated for best director by Directors Guild of America, and Richard Murphy was nominated for best screenplay by the Writers Guild of America.

In The New York Times, A. H. Weiler gave the film a positive review, especially praising the performances of the actors: "In Compulsion they have made a dark deed into a bright and fascinating picture." The film holds a critics' approval rate of 100% on Rotten Tomatoes.

See also
 Leopold and Loeb
 List of American films of 1959
 Murder by Numbers, 2002 film directed by Barbet Schroeder

References

External links

 
 
 
 

1959 films
1959 crime drama films
1950s English-language films
20th Century Fox films
American black-and-white films
American courtroom films
American crime drama films
American legal drama films
Cultural depictions of Clarence Darrow
Films about capital punishment
Films about lawyers
Films based on American novels
Films based on the Leopold and Loeb murder
Films à clef
Films directed by Richard Fleischer
Films produced by Richard D. Zanuck
Films scored by Lionel Newman
Films set in 1924
Films set in Chicago
Films shot in Los Angeles
1950s American films